Keith Thompson may refer to:

 Keith Thompson (politician), veteran figure in the British far right
 H. Keith Thompson (1922-2002), New York City-based corporate executive and figure within American far right circles
 Keith Thompson (footballer) (born 1965), retired professional footballer from England
 Keith R. Thompson, professor of oceanography at Dalhousie University

See also
 Keith Thomson (disambiguation)